Jerry McPeak (born October 21, 1946) is an American politician who served in the Oklahoma House of Representatives from the 13th district from 2004 to 2016.

References

1946 births
21st-century Native American politicians
Living people
Democratic Party members of the Oklahoma House of Representatives
Muscogee (Creek) Nation state legislators in Oklahoma